Joseph Skelly may refer to:
 Joseph Morrison Skelly, professor of history
 Joseph P. Skelly, composer of music